Euxton Balshaw Lane is one of two railway stations situated in Euxton , Lancashire, England.

History
The NUR was split up in 1888, part of it (including Euxton station) becoming wholly owned by the London and North Western Railway (LNWR). Euxton station closed on 2 September 1895 at the behest of the Anderton Family.

Balshaw Lane & Euxton station was closed by British Rail on 6 October 1969 as part of the Beeching review of the UK railway network.

Euxton also had a station at the Royal Ordnance Factory site, ROF Chorley, on the Preston to Manchester line which opened along with the factory in the 1930s; the station was named 'ROF Halt' and closed in 1965.

As well as this another station on the Lancashire and Yorkshire Railway Company's Bolton and Preston Railway was built named  which was near to the Pack Saddle Bridge. Access to this station was via a footbridge from next to today's gastro pub, "The Railway at Euxton". However, this station closed in 1895.

Services from the former Balshaw Lane and Euxton station restarted on 15 December 1997. It was officially reopened in 1998, (the opening ceremony being performed by former Radio 1 DJ and, latterly, Radio Lancashire presenter and transport enthusiast, Andy Peebles), and was now named Euxton Balshaw Lane.

The use of "Balshaw Lane" in the station's name was added, at the time of opening, at Lancashire County Council's behest (the main station's sponsor and funder) in view of the possibility, at some future stage, of the opening of a station on the site of the Royal Ordnance Factory at Euxton and to distinguish itself (and avoid a subsequent name change) from that station. It was expected that the station at the ROF site might be named either "Euxton" or "Euxton ROF". In fact,  when Euxton's other railway station eventually opened in October 2011, on the Manchester-Preston route, it was called .

Facilities
The station has two platforms on the slower north–south lines of the West Coast Main Line and is served by Northern Trains with trains to Blackpool North and Liverpool.  Euxton Balshaw Lane does not have any full-time staff, PA system or ticket office, nor, unlike Horwich Parkway railway station, a station built around the same period, any clocks or display screens.

Services

The station has a daily hourly service in each direction with 2 trains per hour in the weekday peaks. Through weekday services to Blackpool North were restored in May 2018 following the completion of electrification work.

References

Further reading

External links

Railway stations in Chorley
DfT Category F2 stations
Former London and North Western Railway stations
Railway stations in Great Britain opened in 1905
Railway stations in Great Britain closed in 1969
Railway stations in Great Britain opened in 1997
Reopened railway stations in Great Britain
Northern franchise railway stations
Beeching closures in England
Stations on the West Coast Main Line